Malayia is a genus of woodlouse flies in the family Rhinophoridae. There are at least three described species in Malayia.

Species
These three species belong to the genus Malayia:
 Malayia fuscinervis Malloch, 1926
 Malayia indica Lo Giudice, Pape & Cerretti, 2016
 Malayia nigripennis Malloch, 1927

References

Further reading

 

Tachinidae
Articles created by Qbugbot